Stigmella zizyphi is a moth of the family Nepticulidae. It was described by Walsingham in 1911 and is endemic to Algeria.

The larvae feed on Ziziphus lotus. They mine the leaves of their host plant.

References

Nepticulidae
Moths described in 1911
Endemic fauna of Algeria
Moths of Africa
Fauna of the Gambia